Leavenworth Apartments is a historic apartment building located in the Near Northeast neighborhood of Syracuse, Onondaga County, New York. It was designed by architect Charles Erastus Colton and built in 1912.  It is a seven-story, Colonial Revival style asymmetrical building in six sections.  It is a steel frame and masonry building with cast stone details. The building features stepped gable ends. It is located across from the New Kasson Apartments built in 1898.

It was listed on the National Register of Historic Places in 2011.

References

External links

Residential buildings on the National Register of Historic Places in New York (state)
Colonial Revival architecture in New York (state)
Residential buildings completed in 1912
Buildings and structures in Syracuse, New York
National Register of Historic Places in Syracuse, New York